Micah Anthony Hyde (born 10 November 1974) is a coach and former professional footballer who played as a midfielder. Who is currently Head Coach for Queens Park Rangers Under 18's.

He played for Cambridge United and Finnish club Euran Pallo before joining Watford. He made more than 250 league appearances for Watford between 1997 and 2004, and played in the Premier League during the 1999–2000 season. He went on to play for Burnley and Peterborough United before slipping out of professional football in 2009 where he joined Conference Premier side Woking. He briefly returned to the Football League with Barnet before returning to finish his career in non-league with Billericay Town, Aveley and St Albans City.

Hyde was born in England, and made 17 appearances for Jamaica, scoring once.

Hyde came out of retirement in January 2016 signing for Southern Football League side Ware, managed by Ken Charlery.

Club career 
Born in Upton Park in the London Borough of Newham, he played for the youth team of Brimsdown Rovers alongside David Beckham. He joined Watford in 1997 after a move from Cambridge United. Having made well over 200 appearances for Watford, he was sold to Burnley in mid-2004, scoring on his debut against Sheffield United.

Hyde became an established Championship player and was largely considered one of Burnley's most consistent performers over the last two years. His hard-working play in the centre of the park made him almost ever-present in the side. In the 2004–05 season, he ensured himself of a place in Burnley's history when he scored the equalising goal away at Blackburn Rovers, Burnley's local rivals, in a FA Cup game.
At the end of the 2005–06 season, he was placed on the transfer list by Burnley manager Steve Cotterill along with three other players; Gifton Noel-Williams, Danny Karbassiyoon and Duane Courtney, but due to his efforts in pre-season was once again welcomed back to the first-team squad and taken off the list.

On 11 January 2007, he moved to Peterborough United for an initial fee of £75,000 plus an extra £25,000 if Peterborough were promoted in that season. In the 2008–09 season Hyde lost the captaincy at Peterborough to Craig Morgan. Manager, Darren Ferguson, said his reason for this was that he was going to use Micah Hyde 'more sparingly' this term. It was announced after their FA Cup match against Tranmere Rovers on 29 November 2008, that Hyde had his contract cancelled by mutual consent after rejecting loan moves to Barnet, Notts County and Stevenage Borough.

In December 2008 Gillingham manager Mark Stimson took Hyde on trial, with a view to signing the player in the January transfer window. He signed a contract with Woking until the end of the 2008–09 season, on 27 February. He made his debut a day later against Burton Albion. He was released after Woking's relegation and signed a one-year deal with Barnet in July 2009. He scored his first goal for Barnet in the FA Cup against Darlington. He then scored his first league goal for Barnet against Aldershot in February 2010. On 2 June 2010, it was announced on the club website that Hyde had been released by Barnet. He signed for Billericay Town in July.

He signed for St Albans City in December 2011 which is where he remained before retiring from competitive football at the end of the 2011–12 season.

Hyde came out of retirement in January 2016, to sign for Ware, making his debut in a 2–1 home defeat to Kings Langley on 30 January 2016.

Hyde has worked as an academy coach at Dagenham & Redbridge. and as of August 2020 works as an academy coach at QPR.

International career
Despite being born in England, Hyde opted to play for Jamaica, for whom he scored once in 17 appearances between 2001 and 2004.

Personal life
He is the father of Dagenham & Redbridge player Tyrique Hyde.

Career statistics

Club
Source:

International

International goals
England score listed first, score column indicates score after each Hyde goal.

References

External links

Profile at St Albans City FC

English footballers
Jamaican footballers
English people of Jamaican descent
Jamaica international footballers
Brimsdown Rovers F.C. players
Watford F.C. players
Cambridge United F.C. players
Burnley F.C. players
Peterborough United F.C. players
Woking F.C. players
Barnet F.C. players
Billericay Town F.C. players
Aveley F.C. players
St Albans City F.C. players
Ware F.C. players
Premier League players
English Football League players
National League (English football) players
Isthmian League players
Southern Football League players
Footballers from Upton Park, London
Association football midfielders
Expatriate footballers in Finland
1974 births
Living people
Black British sportspeople
Association football coaches
Queens Park Rangers F.C. non-playing staff